Mercédès Brare (born Mercédès Emma Josèphe Brare; December 20, 1880 – January 24, 1967) was a French actress active in film roles from the 1930s to the 1950s.

Filmography 
 1931: Faubourg Montmartre by Raymond Bernard
 1932: His Best Client by Pierre Colombier
 1933: Toto by Jacques Tourneur - Une concurrente de Miss Occasion
 1942: Le Grand Combat by Bernard Roland
 1943: The Phantom Baron by Serge de Poligny
 1944: Le Voyageur sans bagage by Jean Anouilh
 1945: Alone in the Night by Christian Stengel
 1946: Lunegarde by Marc Allégret
 1946:  by Pierre Billon
 1946: Martin Roumagnac by Georges Lacombe
 1951:  by Raymond Leboursier

Theatre 
 1940: Léocadia by Jean Anouilh, Théâtre de la Michodière

Publications 
 Poèmes en prose, La Haye-Pesnel, Manche, imprimerie Garlan, 1947 
 La concierge est dans sa loge, sketch with one character, La Haye-Pesnel, Manche, imprimerie Garlan, 1947
 Hector, sketch with one character, La Haye-Pesnel, Manche, imprimerie Garlan, 1947

External links 
 Mercédès Brare sur Unifrance.org
 
 10 films liés à Mercédès Brare on Ciné-Ressources.net 

20th-century French actresses